Pisoderi is a village 17 km west of Florina, Greece. Nearby, 5 km away, is the  ski resort Vigla.

The ski center is located on Mount Verno, and currently has five lifts and ten trails. The summit of the resort is 1939m above sea level, with a total vertical drop about 420m. The resort  has a view of the Lake Prespa, on the border between Greece, Albania and North Macedonia.

First mentioned in an Ottoman defter of 1481, the village, then known as Ipsoder, had only twelve households. During Ottoman times, the village was purely Aromanian.

Pisoderi had 30 inhabitants in 1981. In fieldwork done by Riki Van Boeschoten in late 1993, Pisoderi was populated by Aromanians. The Aromanian language was used by people of all ages, both in public and private settings, and as the main language for interpersonal relationships. Some elderly villagers had little knowledge of Greek.

Notes

External links 
 Pisoderi website (Greek)
 
 Weather forecast

Tourist attractions in Western Macedonia
Ski areas and resorts in Greece
Populated places in Florina (regional unit)
Aromanian settlements in Greece